Xinle is a county-level city of Hebei Province, North China, it is under the administration of the prefecture-level city of Shijiazhuang.

Administrative divisions
Subdistricts:
Changshou Subdistrict

Towns:
Cheng'an, Hantai, Dongwang, Matoupu, Zhengmo, Dugu, Nandayue, Huapi

Townships:
Xieshen Township, Mucun Township, Pengjiazhuang Hui Ethnic Township

Climate

References

External links

 
County-level cities in Hebei
Shijiazhuang